Otawa is a rural area in the Western Bay of Plenty District and Bay of Plenty Region of New Zealand's North Island. The Otawa Scenic Reserve has several walking tracks varying between 30 minutes and four hours return. The tracks are described as advanced. The peak of Otawa is 565 metres.

Demographics

Otawa had a population of 1,932 at the 2018 New Zealand census, an increase of 216 people (12.6%) since the 2013 census, and an increase of 282 people (17.1%) since the 2006 census. There were 663 households, comprising 984 males and 945 females, giving a sex ratio of 1.04 males per female. The median age was 43.6 years (compared with 37.4 years nationally), with 363 people (18.8%) aged under 15 years, 306 (15.8%) aged 15 to 29, 975 (50.5%) aged 30 to 64, and 288 (14.9%) aged 65 or older.

Ethnicities were 88.5% European/Pākehā, 13.5% Māori, 2.0% Pacific peoples, 3.7% Asian, and 1.9% other ethnicities. People may identify with more than one ethnicity.

The percentage of people born overseas was 14.8, compared with 27.1% nationally.

Although some people chose not to answer the census's question about religious affiliation, 56.5% had no religion, 32.5% were Christian, 0.8% had Māori religious beliefs, 0.5% were Hindu, 0.5% were Buddhist and 3.0% had other religions.

Of those at least 15 years old, 252 (16.1%) people had a bachelor's or higher degree, and 273 (17.4%) people had no formal qualifications. The median income was $39,300, compared with $31,800 nationally. 345 people (22.0%) earned over $70,000 compared to 17.2% nationally. The employment status of those at least 15 was that 918 (58.5%) people were employed full-time, 288 (18.4%) were part-time, and 24 (1.5%) were unemployed.

References

Western Bay of Plenty District
Populated places in the Bay of Plenty Region